The Hungary women's national tennis team represents Hungary in Fed Cup tennis competition and are governed by the Magyar Tenisz Szövetség.  They currently compete in the Europe/Africa Zone of Group I.

History
Hungary competed in its first Fed Cup in 1963.  Their best result was reaching the quarterfinals in 1963 and 1985.

Players
Note: players in bold are part of the 2019 Fed Cup team.

Results

Overview

See also
Fed Cup
Hungary Davis Cup team
Hungary at the Hopman Cup

External links

Billie Jean King Cup teams
Fed Cup
Fed Cup